David Jones was a male English international table tennis player.

He won a silver medal at the 1931 World Table Tennis Championships in the Swaythling Cup (men's team event), a bronze medal at the 1932 World Table Tennis Championships in the men's doubles with Charlie Bull. His third medal came in the 1933 World Table Tennis Championships in the Swaythling Cup (men's team event) for England.

He twice beat the great Viktor Barna in Swaythling Cup matches.

See also
 List of England players at the World Team Table Tennis Championships
 List of World Table Tennis Championships medalists

References

English male table tennis players
World Table Tennis Championships medalists